Haustrum is a genus of sea snails, marine gastropod mollusks in the subfamily Haustrinae of the family Muricidae, the murex snails or rock snails.

Species
Species within the genus Haustrum include:
 Haustrum albomarginatum (Deshayes, 1839)
 Haustrum haustorium (Gmelin, 1791) - synonym: Haustrum zealandicum Perry, 1811
 † Haustrum intermedium (Powell & Bartrum, 1929) 
 Haustrum lacunosum (Bruguière, 1789)
 † Haustrum maximum (Powell & Bartrum, 1929)
 Haustrum scobina (Quoy & Gaimard, 1833)
Synonyms:
 Haustrum baileyanum (Tenison-Woods, 1881): synonym of Bedeva baileyana (Tenison Woods, 1881)
 Haustrum dentex Perry, 1811: synonym of Plicopurpura columellaris (Lamarck, 1816)
 Haustrum flindersi (Adams & Angas, 1863): synonym of Bedeva flindersi (A. Adams & Angas, 1864)
 Haustrum pictum Perry, 1811: synonym of Tribulus planospira (Lamarck, 1822)
 Haustrum striatum Perry, 1811: synonym of Stramonita haemastoma (Linnaeus, 1767)
 Haustrum ventricosum Kaicher, 1980: synonym of Dicathais orbita (Gmelin, 1791)
 Haustrum vinosum (Lamarck, 1822): synonym of Bedeva vinosa (Lamarck, 1822)

References

 Hutton, F. W. (1883). Revision of the recent Rhachiglossate Mollusca of New Zealand. New Zealand Journal of Science (1) 1 (12): 575–576.
 Finlay, H. J. (1928). The Recent Mollusca of the Chatham Islands. Transactions of the New Zealand Institute. 59: 232-286.

External links
 Bruce A. Marshall, Molluscan and brachiopod taxa introduced by F. W. Hutton in The New Zealand journal of science; Journal of the Royal Society of New Zealand, Volume 25, Issue 4, 1995
 Iredale, T. (1912). New generic names and new species of marine Mollusca. Proceedings of the Malacological Society of London. 10(3): 217-228, pl. 9
 Tan K. S. (2003) Phylogenetic analysis and taxonomy of some southern Australian and New Zealand Muricidae (Mollusca: Neogastropoda). Journal of Natural History 37(8): 911-1028.

 
Muricidae